Anna Nehrebecka-Byczewska (born 16 December 1947 in Bytom) is a Polish film actress and politician.

Life and career 
She was born Anna Wojciechowska. Her married surnames are Nehrebecka and Byczewska. In 1969 she graduated from the Theatre Academy in Warsaw, her film debut took place in 1967. In 1969 she became an actress of the Polish Theatre in Warsaw. She acted in many theatre, cinema and TV productions, classic as well as contemporary. She created poetry recitation programmes in radio and television. The series started in the 1970s, and included mainly poetry of Stanisław Baliński, Zofia Bohdanowicz, Ryszard Kiersnowski and Beata Obertyńska.

During the Martial Law in Poland in 1981-1983 she acted in churches and private apartments. She performed poetic concerts in Europe, Australia, New Zealand and in the United States.

She starred movies produced in France and Hungary. She also appeared in an Albanian movie by Kujtim Çashku, "Kolonel Bunker" where she played one of the main roles - the Polish wife of an Albanian officer.

Private life 

Anna Nehrebecka is married to the Polish diplomat Iwo Byczewski.

Selected filmography 
  (1967, directed by Ewa Petelska)
  (1969, directed by Wojciech Marczewski)
  (1970, directed by Julian Dziedzina)
 Family Life (1971, directed by Krzysztof Zanussi)
 Copernicus (1972, directed by Ewa i Czesław Petelscy)
 TV series  (1973, directed by Sylwester Chęciński)
 The Promised Land (1974, directed by Andrzej Wajda)
 Doktor Judym (1975, directed by Wojciech Haupe)
 Nights and Days (1975, directed by Jerzy Antczak)
  (1976, directed by Roman Rydzewski)
  (1976, directed by Jan Budkiewicz)
 TV series Polskie drogi (1976, directed by Janusz Morgenstern)
  (1977, directed by Zbigniew Kamiński)
 Kísértés (1977, directed by Károly Esztergályos)
 TV series  (1978, directed by Jan Rybkowski)
  (1978, directed by Ignacy Gogolewski)
  (1980, directed by Piotr Andrejew)
 TV series Jan Serce (1981, directed by Radosław Piwowarski)
  (1981, directed by Andrzej Piotrowski)
 TV series  (1982, directed by Jerzy Sztwiertnia)
  (1983, directed by Jan Rybkowski)
  (1983, directed by Franciszek Trzeciak)
  (1984, directed by Marek Koterski)
  (1987, directed by Jerzy Sztwiertnia)
  (1990, directed by Andrzej Trzos-Rastawiecki)
  (1994, directed by Krzysztof Tarnas)
 L'aube à l'envers (1995, directed by Sophie Marceau)
  (1996, directed by Krzysztof Zanussi)
  (1997, directed by Maciej Dutkiewicz, Janusz Dymek, Ireneusz Engler, Radosław Piwowarski, Janusz Zaorski)
 Kolonel Bunker (1998, directed by Kujtim Çashku)
 My Father's Bike (2012)
 Life Feels Good (2013)

References

External links 

Polish actresses
Living people
1947 births
Councillors in Warsaw
Civic Platform politicians
People from Bytom
Officers of the Order of Polonia Restituta
Recipients of the Gold Cross of Merit (Poland)
Recipients of the Silver Medal for Merit to Culture – Gloria Artis
Recipient of the Meritorious Activist of Culture badge